is a passenger railway station located in the city of Takamatsu, Kagawa Prefecture, Japan. It is operated by JR Shikoku and has the station number T20.

Lines
The station is served by the JR Shikoku Kōtoku Line and is located 13.4 km from the beginning of the line at Takamatsu. Only local services stop at the station.

Layout
Sanuki-Mure Station consists of a side platform serving a single track. There is no station building, only a weather shelter on the platform for waiting passengers and  a "Tickets Corner" (a small shelter housing an automatic ticket vending machine). A ramp leads up to the platform from the access road. A bike shed is provided at the station entrance.

History
Japanese National Railways (JNR) opened Sanuki-Mure Station on 1 November 1986 a temporary stop on the existing Kōtoku Line. With the privatization of JNR on 1 April 1987, JR Shikoku assumed control and the stop was upgraded to a full station.

Surrounding area
 Yakuri-Shinmichi Station, operated by Kotoden
Kagawa Prefectural Takamatsu Kita Junior and Senior High School
Japan National Route 11

See also
List of railway stations in Japan

References

External links

Station timetable

Railway stations in Kagawa Prefecture
Railway stations in Japan opened in 1986
Railway stations in Takamatsu